The Copa Sudamericana is an annual association football tournament established in 2002. The competition is organized by the South American Football Confederation, or CONMEBOL, and it is contested by 39 clubs from its member association. From 2004 to 2008, clubs from the CONCACAF were invited to participate. The finals are contested over two legs, one at each participating club's stadium. San Lorenzo won the inaugural competition in 2002, defeating Atlético Nacional.

Seventeen clubs have won the competition since its inception. Boca Juniors, Independiente, Athletico Paranaense, and Independiente del Valle hold the record for the most victories, winning the competition two times. Boca Juniors is also the only club to have successfully defended their title. Teams from Argentina have won the competition the most, with nine wins among them.

The current champion is Independiente del Valle, who defeated São Paulo in the 2022 edition.

List of finals

 The "LIB" note by a team means that the team initially competed in the Copa Libertadores for that season (since the 2017 season).

Performances

By club

By country

See also
List of Copa Sudamericana winning managers

Notes

References

External links
Copa Sudamericana official history
Copa Sudamericana on RSSSF

Winners
Copa Sudamericana